Sean Phekoo (born February 13, 1981), known by his stage name/surname Phekoo (pronounced Fāy-Ko͞o, stylized as PHEKOO) is an American composer, musician and record producer.  In 2013 Phekoo became the first foreigner ever to win the Japan Record Award Grand Prize (JRA) for "Song of the Year". Phekoo is a member of the band Red Diamond Dogs (RDD).

Career
Phekoo is the composer for the multi-platinum single "Exile Pride" by male vocal-dance group Exile.

The official music video for Exile Pride won Video of the Year at the 2014 MTV Video Music Awards Japan.

Phekoo composed the song Angel Heart, from album Love Ballade, by male vocalist Exile Atsushi. On December 3, 2012 Love Ballade debuted at #1 on the Oricon charts. Angel Heart was the "theme song" for the Japanese Red Cross Society's "Cross Now!" campaign in 2014 and 2015.

Phekoo is a member of Japan-based pop band Red Diamond Dogs (RDD), featuring singer-songerwriter Exile Atsushi. In 2016, RDD made their debut on the "Exile Atsushi It's Showtime!!" Japan tour, performing 11 shows.

Discography

Compositions

Singles

References

American pop musicians
21st-century American composers
1981 births
Living people